The 2001 Birmingham bombing was a terrorist attack on the city centre of Birmingham.

History
There was a partial detonation of a car bomb in the city centre of Birmingham on Saturday 3 November 2001. The Real Irish Republican Army (RIRA), a dissident Irish Republican terror group, was responsible. The RIRA gave a telephone warning before the device exploded outside a busy nightclub on Smallbrook Queensway, near the corner with Hurst Street and 250m south of New Street station - just  from the location of the Birmingham pub bombings in 1974. The bomb was similar in size to those used in the BBC bombing and Ealing bombing that year, but only the detonator exploded, leaving  of home-made explosives intact. An officer from the West Midlands Police said the bomb, if fully detonated, could have caused a "very serious loss of life" on the busy road. The timing and location of the bombing (10:39 PM on a Saturday night outside a busy nightclub) were likely chosen to maximize damage to the public. It was the final bombing of the Troubles in Great Britain.

The attack came during a tense period of the Northern Ireland peace process.

Convictions
In November 2001, three men – Noel Maguire, Robert Hulme and his brother Aiden Hulme – were arrested in connection with the bomb attacks in Birmingham and London that year. They were all later convicted at the Old Bailey on 8 April 2003. Robert and Aiden Hulme were each jailed for 20 years. Noel Maguire, who the judge said played "a major part in the bombing conspiracy", was sentenced to 22 years. Two other men, James McCormack, of County Louth, and John Hannan, of Newtownbutler, County Fermanagh, had already admitted the charge at an earlier hearing. McCormack, who played the most serious part of the five, the judge said, was jailed for twenty-two years. John Hannan, who was seventeen at the time of the incidents, was given sixteen years detention. All had links to the Real IRA stronghold of Dundalk in the Republic of Ireland.

See also
 2000 MI6 attack
2001 Ealing bombing
2001 BBC bombing
Birmingham pub bombings
2007 London car bombs
 Chronology of the Northern Ireland Troubles

Notes

Real Irish Republican Army actions
2001 crimes in the United Kingdom
Failed terrorist attempts in the United Kingdom
History of Birmingham, West Midlands
Terrorist incidents in Birmingham
2000s in Birmingham, West Midlands
Car and truck bombings in England
Terrorist incidents in the United Kingdom in 2001
November 2001 events in the United Kingdom
Attacks by Republicans since the Good Friday Agreement